

Gerhard Lindner (26 December 1896 – 3 June 1982) was a general in the Wehrmacht of Nazi Germany during World War II. He was a recipient of the Knight's Cross of the Iron Cross.

Awards and decorations

 Knight's Cross of the Iron Cross on 5 May 1945 as Generalmajor and commander of 346. Infanterie-Division

References

Citations

Bibliography

 

1896 births
1982 deaths
People from Bautzen
Major generals of the German Army (Wehrmacht)
German Army personnel of World War I
Recipients of the clasp to the Iron Cross, 1st class
Recipients of the Gold German Cross
Recipients of the Knight's Cross of the Iron Cross
German prisoners of war in World War II
People from the Kingdom of Saxony
Military personnel from Saxony
German Army generals of World War II